Wanda Gołkowska (17 December 1925 – 7 August 2013) was a Polish artist.

Background 
Gołkowska was born on December 17, 1925 in Rzeszów. She attended the Primary School in Grajewo. In 1946, Gołkowska started studying at the Faculty of Humanities at the University of Torun, but she and her family moved to Wroclaw in the same year. From 1946 to 1952, Gołkowska studied at the Faculty of Painting at the Academy of Fine Arts in Wroclaw , in the studio of Eugeniusz Geppert. In 1991, she became a full professor at the Eugeniusz Geppert Academy of Fine Arts. Between 1953 and 2006, Gołkowska took part in around 300 group exhibitions, and events, and presented over 30 individual exhibitions in Poland and abroad. She passed away on August 7, 2013 in Wrocław.

References 

Polish contemporary artists
2013 deaths
Polish educational theorists
Nicolaus Copernicus University in Toruń alumni
1925 births